Do Gacheh or Dugacheh may refer to:
 Do Gacheh, Bagh-e Malek
 Do Gacheh, Ramhormoz